Sigri may refer to:

 Sigri (village), Lesbos, Greece
Sigri (stove)
Sigri (coffee), a coffee brand in Papua New Guinea